Octopus Pie is a webcomic written and drawn by Meredith Gran, and coloured by Valerie Halla and Sloane Leong. It focuses on the misadventures of two 20-something women living in Brooklyn, New York. It was updated every Monday, Wednesday and Friday. 1026 strips were published. The comic has been featured in an article in the New York Daily News.

Octopus Pie ended on June 5, 2017, with an epilogue, Octopus Pie: The Other Side running from March 1 to April 7, 2021. Another follow-up, Octopus Pie Eternal was published on November 23, 2022.

Content
The comic largely follows a character-based narrative, mixing drama and light humor that sometimes borders on the surreal. With some swearing and partial nudity, it greatly relies on the juxtaposition of the two protagonists, as well as their relationships with and the relationships between other characters. Octopus Pie has the feel of an indie comic, focusing on young urbanites, usually from Gen Y.

Main characters
Everest "Eve" Ning
- Eve is a creative writing graduate from Brooklyn who has already become embittered at just about every aspect of her life, and the universe in general. Grumpy, cynical, and introverted, Eve has a menial job at Olly's Organix, an organic grocer, and has no clear idea about what she wants to do with her future. Early chapters of the strip focused on Eve's initially rocky relationship with her roommate Hanna, but the two have since become very close friends, despite their contrasting personalities and lifestyles. Eve's inhibitions and emotional distance have led many of her friends to view her as strong-willed and resilient, but Eve does not see herself this way.

Hanna Thompson
- Eve's free-spirited, strong-willed and outgoing roommate Hanna is Eve's opposite in many respects, and early story arcs often focused on their Odd Couple-like relationship. Hanna moved in with Eve after Eve's mom found her on "the Craig List" and remembered Hanna as Eve's preschool classmate. Hanna's uninhibited, marijuana-fueled lifestyle is sometimes a source of friction between her and Eve. In contrast to the stereotypical stoner, Hanna is a professional, hard-working small-business owner. Her business, Bake'N'Bake, provides baked goods (which Hanna prepares while high on marijuana, lending the business its name) to a variety of cafes and specialty grocers throughout the city, including Eve's employer, Olly's Organix. She has been in a happy long-term relationship with her live-in boyfriend Marek since the strip began.

Marek Kulasenski
- Hanna's warm-hearted, gentle boyfriend Marek is a Polish citizen attending graduate school in the city. He possesses a Zen-like calm and patience, and has almost never been provoked to anger. His relationship with Hanna is stable and happy, and Marek's accommodating nature is often instrumental in keeping the peace between the two. It's been hinted that Marek one day wants to raise a family, which may foreshadow darker times for the couple, as Hanna is adamant in her desire to never have children.

Will LeBlanc
- Will is a bartender, marijuana dealer, and general "urban mercenary." Will is charismatic and thoughtful, but his short temper and impulsive nature sometimes lead him to make poor decisions. He was briefly involved in a romantic relationship with Eve, but she ended their relationship when she learned that he was a drug dealer. Will lives with his longtime friend Larry, a sleazy-yet-likeable scam artist. A lengthy relationship with Hanna's friend Marigold ended with a nasty break-up. He is now dating a woman named Aimee, who he began seeing before breaking up with Marigold. It has been hinted that he and Eve still have some feelings for one another.

Marigold Fuchs
- Hanna's best friend from college, Marigold is kind, easy-going, naive, and somewhat impressionable. She began as a minor character in Hanna's circle of friends, but has gradually become a central character. During Marigold's relationship with Will, she was in awe of the perceived glamor and excitement of Will's life as a drug dealer until she accompanied him for a day on the job and learned that it was actually fairly mundane. In the aftermath their very rough and painful break-up, Marigold cut off her dreadlocks and reevaluated her life. Although disillusioned with her job, Marigold eventually decided to accept a lucrative promotion at Bed and Bath 3000 and moved into an upscale Manhattan apartment using her new salary.

Plot arcs
Introductions

Fairly self-explanatory, introduces the general flow of the comic. Eve has just broken up with her boyfriend, James, and Hanna moves in. Eve's job and the general state of her life is introduced.

Bicycle Rights

Eve's bicycle (Mr. Pedals) is stolen, which prompts her to become paranoid about security.

Bake n' Bake

Explores the mystery of what Hanna does for a living, also introduces Marek and Will.

Grocery Misconduct

Hanna goes topless in Central Park while Marek gives Eve the inspiration to learn of 'Duck Zen' when she spots her ex-boyfriend James with another girl. Then When Olly, Eve's boss, needs to come up with a new ad campaign for the store, Eve jokingly draws a crude dog that calls the store "The Fukken Shit" - not knowing that the drawing will be seen as Olly's temporary downfall and Eve's temporary popularity.

Natural Phenomenon

When James, Eve's ex-boyfriend unexpectedly shows up at their front door, Eve and Hanna make a run for it (Hanna thinking James is a Narc), and Eve eventually winds up hanging out with Will. Eve then discovers that Will is Hannah's drug dealer.

Skate or Don't

On an ice skating outing, Hanna cracks her coccyx and Eve confronts a rival from her childhood. Eve's father appears in flashbacks.

Our Brooklynian Life

While hanging out with Hanna, Eve finds and cares for a parrot. While the parrot gives her added attention, she also has to deal with the return of Will.

Tag

Eve's old friends and Hannah's stoner buddies collide for a game of Laser Tag as Eve rekindles a romance with ex-boyfriend Park.

Renaissance Unfair

Hanna recruits her friends to help her gain independence from Olly's Organix at a Renaissance Fair. Will becomes embroiled in courtly love and a fight with the coordinator's son.

Octopus Pie Love Comics

A brief interlude starring Julie of Olly's Organix in her quest for love.

Dumbo

Olly's latest attempt at staying profitable is Ollyween, and all his employees must participate.

Interview

Park interviews for a law firm with some pretty awful results.

Exile on Jericho Turnpike

Eve visits her brother and her father for his birthday and troubles about the amount of influence she has in their lives.

Love Anxiously

It's Valentine's Day and everyone gets a little lesson in jealousy.

Lifetime TV

The Ning siblings grew up wishing they could be contestants on their favorite shopping-based gameshow. Today, they stumble upon reality.

This is How I Deal

Feeling hopeless in her day-to-day life, Marigold decides that surely, Will's job must be more interesting. A drug-dealing adventure awaits!

Snowy Patrol

Hanna agrees to watch Park's dog Snowy for the weekend, in hopes of gaining his trust. Meanwhile, the possibility arises that Park (and Eve, by extension) could be leaving town soon.

Beer Your Own Boss

Olly figures out that beer is made by people, and orders Eve, Julie and Jacob to make some for the store.

Fear Part 1

The annual bike festival is upon Brooklyn, and with it comes a whole laundry list of anxieties.

Fear Part 2

The bike festival concludes with Hanna and her unicycle-riding rival, Park's secret is revealed, and Eve's bittersweet conclusion about fear.

Who Are Parents

A visit to Hanna's parents' house leads to the discovery of a terrible, terrible artifact. Eve, meanwhile, is pondering the role of parents in her life.

Couch Sitter

Eve, Hanna and Marek have a soft-spoken house guest named Victor.

Frontwards

Eve and Park's relationship has reached a crossroads, and whatever happens is going to suck.

Moving On

Eve, Hanna and Marek suddenly decide to leave home. Apartment-hopping abound.

GO Team Willary

Will is rejoined by his partner and friend Larry, who has a new business venture. Their reunion is not without some girl troubles and introspection.

Octopus DIE

A non-canon whodunnit as Will rents out a mansion for what is supposed to be an awesome Halloween party. Pretty much everyone dies.

The Brownout Biscuit

Some unfortunate events disrupt the adults' social group. Hanna and Eve each take the blame for Marigold's despair, and try to fix things in unimaginable ways.

Follow Your Friend to Work Day

It Could’ve Been a Brilliant Career

Basement Full of Buddies

Fired, Walk With Me

Stranger Into Starman

Metadater

Octopie Wall Street

It's a Christmas Miserable

Itch You Can't Scratch

Simple Breakfast

Just Be Cool Already

You Don't Need Anything

Vacation Day

The Gray Lady

That Camp Aesthetic

Living Vicariously in a Deep Life

What's Different Now (It's A Coconut)

The Witch Lives

Spa Queen

Summer For Suckers

Boy Problems

Metronome

Starfish

Where the Chaos Goes

People Seriously Live Here
The final chapter.

Social issues
While Octopus Pie is primarily a humorous strip, it has dealt with wider social issues, such as the right for women to go topless.

Awards
The storyline "Brownout Biscuit" won the 2014 Ignatz Award for "Outstanding Story." In 2016, the comic won the Ignatz Award for "Outstanding Online Comic".

Collected editions
Prior to 2016 multiple editions compiling the comic were published, but starting that year the comic was compiled (including previously published material) in new, definitive editions.
 Octopus Pie Volume 1, February 2016, Image Comics, 
 Octopus Pie Volume 2, March 2016, Image Comics, 
 Octopus Pie Volume 3, April 2016, Image Comics, 
 Octopus Pie Volume 4, May 2016, Image Comics, 
 Octopus Pie Volume 5, June 2017, Image Comics, 
Obsolete publications:
 Octopus Pie: A Brooklyn Drama, 2008, collects Introductions through Grocery Misconduct
 Octopus Pie: A Brownstone Companion, July 2008, collects Natural Phenomenon through Our Brooklynian Life
 Octopus Pie: An Interstate Oasis, April 2009, collects Tag through the first part of Interview, but does not include Octopus Pie Love Comics
 Octopus Pie: There are no Stars in Brooklyn, 2010, Villard Books,  - collects first two years of strips, with new title pages for each story
 Octopus Pie: Listen at Home with Octopus Pie, May 2011, collects Exile on Jericho Turnpike through Frontwards
 Octopus Pie: Dead Forever, May 2014, collects Moving On through Simple Breakfast

Notes

External links

Interview with Meredith Gran
Review of Octopus Pie, ComixTalk, July 2008
Meredith Gran, Octopus Pie, Gothamist
"Octopus Pie Extends Its Reach", Publishers Weekly
Why You Should Read Octopus Pie, the Quintessential Millennial Webcomic, From the Very Beginning, Slate

American comedy webcomics
2000s webcomics
Web Cartoonists' Choice Award winners
Creative Commons-licensed comics
2007 webcomic debuts
2017 webcomic endings
2010s webcomics
Ignatz Award winners for Outstanding Online Comic
Ignatz Award winners for Outstanding Story